The women's 400 metres hurdles event at the 2003 Summer Universiade was held in Daegu, South Korea with the final on 27–30 August.

Medalists

Results

Heats

Final

References
Results

Athletics at the 2003 Summer Universiade
2003 in women's athletics
2003